Rajnagar is an upazila of the Moulvibazar District in the Division of Sylhet, Bangladesh. The district has roughly 29,300 houses and an area of approximately 340 km2. There are three well-known rivers which flow across the Upazila border side of Rajnagar: the Kushiara in the North, the Manu across the southern three unions (Kamarchak, Tengrabazar, and Mansurnager), and the Dholai across Kamarchak and the southern border.

Etymology
The name of the city, Rajnagar is derived from two words, Raj and nagar, meaning "City of the King". It possibly refers to the kings of the ancient Ita kingdom wherein Rajnagar was the capital.

History
It is suggested that the area was inhabited by Buddhists and Hindus as evidence from inscriptions suggests there was an ancient university in Panchgaon, Rajnagar. The terrain was headquarters of the ancient Ita Kingdom founded by Raja Bhanu Narayan and its capital was in the villages of Bhumiura and Eolatoli.. Copper plates have been found from 930 AD in Paschimbagh, Tengubazar Mandir, Rajnagar. The district was also part of the ancient Kamarupa kingdom. In the mid-14th century, Shah Ruknuddin settled and propagated Islam in Kadamhata, Ita Pargana. Ruknuddin's mazar remains in Kadamhata Bazar.

Rajnagar contains many tea gardens and historical places. During the Bangladesh Liberation War, the Panchgaon Factory in Rajnagar Upazila produced cannons under the command of M. A. G. Osmani. A famous historical cannon, nicknamed Jahankosa, built by Janardan Karmakar remains in display in Dhaka. The first Upazila Chairman Freedom Fighter Rana Choudhury is the founder of Rajnagar Degree College (Principal Abdul Ahad Choudhury founded the college in 1982); Major General Abdu Rab is the co-founder of that college. The present Upazila Chairman is Freedom Fighter Md. Askir Khan of the Ruling Party Awamileague. For the last two terms Md. Misbahuduzza (Velai) of Awamileague has been the Upazila Chairman of Rajnagar.
Munshibazar is one of the most important commercial unions in this Upazila due to the large number of goods and services. The tea gardens produce plenty of different types of tea and fruit as well. It has big Hawrs and hills that makes it unique one in the upazilla.
A list of important figures in Munshibazar are given below.
 Eng. Syed Golam Sarwar, Ex-Superintendent Engineer, DPHE, BANGLADESH
 Mr. Mohtossir Ali, Educationalist
 Mr.Engineer  Farashat Ali, Chairman, NRB Commercial Bank Limited, Bangladesh
 Dr. Syed Sharmin Sarwar, M. A. G. Osmani Medical college, Sylhet, Bangladesh.
 Mr. Syed Golam Shahajarul Alam, Joint Director, Bangladesh Bank.
 Mr. Khan Jamal Nurul Islam. writer & Journalist (Editor-of  Shahajalal Darpan, fortnight Bengali).
 Mr. K M Abu Taher Choudhury . Prominent Journalist (President of Bangladesh Journalist Association of UK.)

KAMARCHAK UNION : The Kamarchak Union is the most famous of the eight unions, as many well-known people were born and still live in the region. Most of the people are peaceful, progressive and creative. The union consists of 44 villages and does substantial business through foreign exchange earned by man-power exported in different countries in the World. In 1971, during the freedom fighting, Kamarchak was one of the most advantageous place and safe haven for freedom fighters. Fighters under Kazi Jafor Ahmed, ex-Prime Minister of the Jatiya Party government, organized and fought from this union. Kamarchak is almost surrounded by two rivers - the Manu to the north and the Dholai across (which is crisscrossed by the Udna and the Palki, two smaller rivers). Very often, this union becomes affected by floods but produces plenty of paddy, sugarcane, and vegetables. River erosion, flooding, a poor communications infrastructure, and a low literacy rate are the four main problems. The "Vishnu Pod" Dham (named after the Foot Sign of God Vishnu), one of the sacred places of the Hindus, is situated half a kilometer away, to the east of Tarapasha Bazar. Tarapasha High School, (now a high school and college) founded in 1932 on the donated estate of the Nag family, is one of the oldest educational institutions in Rajnagar. The founding headmaster of this school was late Md. Rezawar Khan, a very respected educator. There is a Branch of Bangladesh Sonali Bank since three decades.

Demographics
As of the 2011 Bangladesh Census, Rajnagar's population was 232,666, with 113,149 males and 119,517 females. The religious make-up is 180,566 Muslims, 51,867 Hindus, 4 Buddhists, 133 Christians, and 92 people of other religions. This Upazila's over-18 population is about 100,000. Rajnagar has an average literacy rate of 48.6%, above the national average of 42.4%.

Climate

Administration
Rajnagar Upazila is divided into eight union parishads: Fatehpur, Kamarchak, Mansurnagar, Munshi Bazar, Panchgaon, Rajnagar, Tengra, and Uttarbhag. The union parishads are subdivided into 143 mauzas and 267 villages.

Notable people
Begum Serajunnessa Choudhury, businesswoman and politician
Shah Ruknuddin, Sufi preacher

See also
 Upazilas of Bangladesh
 Districts of Bangladesh
 Divisions of Bangladesh

References